Anchonastus is a genus of African huntsman spiders that was first described by Eugène Louis Simon in 1898.

Species
 it contains four species, found in Africa:
Anchonastus caudatus Simon, 1898 (type) – Cameroon
Anchonastus gertschi Lessert, 1946 – Congo
Anchonastus pilipodus (Strand, 1913) – Central Africa
Anchonastus plumosus (Pocock, 1900) – West Africa

See also
 List of Sparassidae species

References

Araneomorphae genera
Sparassidae
Spiders of Africa